The 1975–76 NHL season was the 59th season of the National Hockey League. The Montreal Canadiens won the Stanley Cup, defeating the defending champion Philadelphia Flyers in the final.

This season also marked the final time that Hockey Night in Canada on CBC in Canada would air both radio and television broadcasts of games; the show would become exclusive to television the next season.

Regular season
The Montreal Canadiens set records in wins with 58 and points with 127, beginning a four-year stretch where they would dominate the league in the regular season and win four straight Stanley Cup titles.  The Philadelphia Flyers tied the record set by the 1929–30 Boston Bruins for most consecutive home ice wins, with 20.

During the regular season, between December 28 and January 10, "Super Series '76" took place as two teams from the Soviet Championship League played eight exhibitions against NHL teams. HC CSKA Moscow (the "Red Army Club"), defending Soviet champion, played against the New York Rangers, Montreal, Boston and, on January 11, the defending NHL champion, the Philadelphia Flyers, while Krylya Sovetov Moscow ("the Soviet Wings") played against Pittsburgh, Buffalo, Chicago and the New York Islanders.

The New York Rangers got off to their worst start since 1965-66. Under
pressure, Emile Francis traded Derek Sanderson to St.Louis and put goaltender Eddie Giacomin on waivers. Detroit claimed him, and then the blockbuster trade of the year saw the Boston Bruins send superstar center Phil Esposito and star defenceman Carol Vadnais to the New York Rangers for star center Jean Ratelle and 
superstar defenceman Brad Park.  Both Ratelle and Park would excel for the Bruins for years to come, while Esposito's days as the preeminent scorer in the NHL were behind him. Trades did not help the Rangers, as they gave up 333 goals against and finished last in the
Patrick Division, which cost Emile Francis his job as general
manager, and coach Ron Stewart was fired as well. John Ferguson Sr.
took over both jobs.

The Kansas City Scouts established a dubious distinction, winning only
one of their final 44 games.

On February 7, 1976, Darryl Sittler set an NHL record that still stands for most points scored in one game. He recorded ten points (six goals, four assists) against the Boston Bruins.

Final standings
Note: GP = Games played, W = Wins, L = Losses, T = Ties, Pts = Points, GF = Goals for, GA = Goals against, PIM = Penalties in minutes

Note: Teams that qualified for the playoffs are highlighted in bold

Prince of Wales Conference

Clarence Campbell Conference

Playoffs

Playoff seeds

The twelve teams that qualified for the playoffs are ranked 1–12 based on regular season points.

Note: Only teams that qualified for the playoffs are listed here.

 Montreal Canadiens, Norris Division champions, Prince of Wales Conference regular season champions – 127 points
 Philadelphia Flyers, Patrick Division champions, Clarence Campbell Conference regular season champions – 118 points
 Boston Bruins, Adams Division champions – 113 points
 Buffalo Sabres – 105 points
 New York Islanders – 101 points
 Los Angeles Kings – 85 points
 Toronto Maple Leafs – 83 points
 Pittsburgh Penguins – 82 points (35 wins, 5 points head-to-head vs. Atlanta)
 Atlanta Flames – 82 points (35 wins, 3 points head-to-head vs. Pittsburgh)
 Chicago Black Hawks, Smythe Division champions – 82 points (32 wins)
 Vancouver Canucks – 81 points
 St. Louis Blues – 72 points

Playoff bracket

 Division winners earned a bye to the quarterfinals
 Teams were re-seeded based on regular season record after the Preliminary and Quarterfinal rounds

Preliminary round

(1) Buffalo Sabres vs. (8) St. Louis Blues
The Buffalo Sabres were the first seed of the preliminary round and fourth overall with 105 points. The St. Louis Blues were the eighth seed of the preliminary round and twelfth overall with 72 points. This was the first playoff series between these two teams. The Buffalo Sabres won this year's regular season series earning 5 of 8 points.

(2) New York Islanders vs. (7) Vancouver Canucks
The New York Islanders were the second seed in the preliminary round and fifth overall with 101 points. The Vancouver Canucks were the seventh seed in the preliminary round and eleventh overall with 81 points. This was the first playoff series between these two teams. Vancouver won this year's regular season series earning 8 of 10 points.

(3) Los Angeles Kings vs. (6) Atlanta Flames
The Los Angeles Kings were the third seed of the preliminary round and sixth overall 85 points. The Atlanta Flames were the sixth seed of the preliminary round and ninth overall with 82 points, losing the tie-breaker to Pittsburgh in head-to-head points (5 to 3). This was the first playoff meeting between these two teams. Los Angeles won this year's regular season series earning 6 of 8 points.

(4) Toronto Maple Leafs vs. (5) Pittsburgh Penguins
The Toronto Maple Leafs were the fourth seed in the preliminary round and seventh overall with 83 points. The Pittsburgh Penguins were the fifth seed in the preliminary round and eighth overall with 82 points, winning the tiebreaker over Atlanta in head-to-head points (5 to 3). This was the first playoff series between these two teams. Pittsburgh won this year's regular season series earning 8 of 10 points.

Quarterfinals

(1) Montreal Canadiens vs. (8) Chicago Black Hawks
The Montreal Canadiens finished first in the league with 127 points. The Chicago Black Hawks finished as the Smythe Division Champions and eighth seed of the quarterfinals with 82 points. This was the 17th playoff series between these two teams. Montreal lead 11–5 in previous meetings. Their most recent meeting came in the 1973 Stanley Cup Finals, which Montreal won in six games. Montreal won this year's regular season series earning 5 of 8 points.

(2) Philadelphia Flyers vs. (7) Toronto Maple Leafs
The Philadelphia Flyers finished as Clarence Campbell Conference regular season champions and second seed overall with 118 points. This was the second playoff series meeting between these two teams. This was a rematch of last year's Stanley Cup Quarterfinals, which Philadelphia won in a four-game sweep. Philadelphia won this year's regular season series earning 7 of 8 points.

(3) Boston Bruins vs. (6) Los Angeles Kings
The Boston Bruins finished as the Adams Division regular season champions and third seed overall with 113 points. This was the first playoff series between these two teams. Boston won this year's regular season series earning 8 of 10 points.

(4) Buffalo Sabres vs. (5) New York Islanders
This was the first playoff series between these two teams. The teams split this year's four-game regular season series.

Semifinals

(1) Montreal Canadiens vs. (4) New York Islanders

This was the first playoff series meeting between these two teams.

(2) Philadelphia Flyers vs. (3) Boston Bruins

This was the second playoff series meeting between these two teams. Philadelphia won the only previous meeting in a major upset in the 1974 Stanley Cup Finals in six games.

Stanley Cup Finals

This was the second playoff series (and only Finals) meeting between these two teams. Montreal won the only previous meeting in the 1973 Stanley Cup Semifinals in five games.

The two-time defending Stanley Cup Champions, the Philadelphia Flyers, once again made it to the finals, but were swept in four games by the Montreal Canadiens.

Awards

All-Star teams

Player statistics

Scoring leaders
Note: GP = Games played; G = Goals; A = Assists; Pts = Points

Source: NHL.

Leading goaltenders

Note: GP = Games played; Min – Minutes played; GA = Goals against; GAA = Goals against average; W = Wins; L = Losses; T = Ties; SO = Shutouts

Other statistics
 Plus-minus: Bobby Clarke, Philadelphia Flyers

Coaches

Patrick Division
Atlanta Flames: Fred Creighton
New York Islanders: Al Arbour
New York Rangers: Ron Stewart and John Ferguson Sr.
Philadelphia Flyers: Fred Shero

Adams Division
Boston Bruins: Don Cherry
Buffalo Sabres: Floyd Smith
California Golden Seals: Jack Evans
Toronto Maple Leafs: Red Kelly

Norris Division
Detroit Red Wings: Alex Delvecchio
Los Angeles Kings: Bob Pulford
Montreal Canadiens: Scotty Bowman
Pittsburgh Penguins: Marc Boileau and Ken Schinkel
Washington Capitals: Milt Schmidt and Tom McVie

Smythe Division
Chicago Black Hawks: Billy Reay
Kansas City Scouts: Bep Guidolin, Sid Abel and Eddie Bush
Minnesota North Stars: Ted Harris
St. Louis Blues: Garry Young, Lynn Patrick and Leo Boivin
Vancouver Canucks: Phil Maloney

Debuts
The following is a list of players of note who played their first NHL game in 1975–76 (listed with their first team, asterisk(*) marks debut in playoffs):
Willi Plett, Atlanta Flames
Dennis Maruk, California Golden Seals
Bob Murray, Chicago Blackhawks
Gary Sargent, Los Angeles Kings
Doug Jarvis, Montreal Canadiens
Doug Risebrough, Montreal Canadiens
Bryan Trottier, New York Islanders
Mel Bridgman, Philadelphia Flyers

Last games
The following is a list of players of note that played their last game in the NHL in 1975–76 (listed with their last team):
Gary Bergman, Kansas City Scouts
Bryan Hextall Jr., Minnesota North Stars
Chico Maki, Chicago Black Hawks
Bob Nevin, Los Angeles Kings
Noel Price, Atlanta Flames
Mickey Redmond, Detroit Red Wings
Bill White, Chicago Black Hawks
Terry Crisp, Philadelphia Flyers
Andre Boudrias, Vancouver Canucks
Tommy Williams, Washington Capitals

NOTE:  Boudrias finished his major professional career in the World Hockey Association.

See also 
 List of Stanley Cup champions
 1975 NHL Amateur Draft
 1975–76 NHL transactions
 29th National Hockey League All-Star Game
 National Hockey League All-Star Game
 List of WHA seasons
 Ice hockey at the 1976 Winter Olympics
 1975 in sports
 1976 in sports

References
 
 
 
 

Notes

External links
Hockey Database
NHL.com

 
1L
1975–76 in American ice hockey by league